Tazawagawa Dam is a gravity dam located in Yamagata Prefecture in Japan. The dam is used for flood control and water supply. The catchment area of the dam is 23.2 km2. The dam impounds about 35  ha of land when full and can store 9100 thousand cubic meters of water. The construction of the dam was started on 1981 and completed in 2001.

References

Dams in Yamagata Prefecture
2001 establishments in Japan